Pachliopta atropos is a species of butterfly in the family Papilionidae. It is endemic to the Philippines. 

The first description was in 1888 by Staudinger. The wingspan is about 8 – 9 cm.  The ground colour of the forewing is grey with dark-brown or black veins and markings.The scalloped hindwing is black. The red abdomen has darkened spots.

See also
 Ecoregions in the Philippines

References

Pachliopta
Lepidoptera of the Philippines
Taxonomy articles created by Polbot
Butterflies described in 1888